Janguyeh (also Romanized as Jangūyeh; also known as Changū, Jangū, and Jengū) is a village in Seyfabad Rural District, in the Central District of Khonj County, Fars Province, Iran. At the 2006 census, its population was 461, in 94 families.

References 

Populated places in Khonj County